Fricke is a surname. Notable people with the surname include:

Aaron Fricke (born 1961), American gay rights activist
Anna Fricke, American television writer and producer
Ben Fricke (1975–2011), American football player
Brian Fricke (born 1981), Iraq War veteran, gay rights activist
 Cosima Fricke (born 2000), Argentinian model, musician and cinematographer.
David Fricke, senior editor of Rolling Stone magazine
Ernst-August Fricke (1911–1943), Oberstleutnant in the Wehrmacht during World War II
Ferdinand-Wilhelm Fricke (1863–1927), founder of the oldest rugby union club in Germany
Florian Fricke (1944–2001), German musician
Heinz Fricke, German conductor, Music Director of the Washington National Opera
Janie Fricke (born 1947), American country music singer
Jimmy Fricke (born 1987), American poker player
John Fricke, American film historian
Justin Fricke,(born 1989) North American Hobby horse riding champion and creater of the "rainbow double mctwist" hobby horse riding maneuver 
 Kathrin Fricke, the German web-artist Coldmirror
Kevin Fricke (born 1976), American entrepreneur and fitness explorer
Kurt Fricke (1889–1945), Admiral with the Kriegsmarine during World War II
Olaf Fricke (born 1951), West German slalom canoeist
Otto Fricke (born 1965), German politician
Peter Fricke (born 1939), German television actor
Robert Fricke (1861–1930), German mathematician
Roman Fricke (born 1977), German high jumper
Ron Fricke, American film director and cinematographer
Rusty Fricke (born 1964), American football player
Siegfried Fricke (born 1954), German rower, later became a politician
Tyler Fricke (born 1994), United States Army Officer
Walburga Fricke (born 1936), German politician
Walter Fricke (1915 – 1988), German professor of theoretical astronomy and cryptanalyst in Wehrmacht during World War II
Willi Fricke (1913–1963), German international footballer

See also
1561 Fricke, main-belt asteroid
Fricke v. Lynch 491 F.Supp. 381 (1980), decision in the United States District Court
Bricker, a surname
Fricker, a surname
Frickley (disambiguation)

Surnames from given names